RAF Anwick is a former Second World War faux Royal Air Force station near the village of Anwick,  south east of the county town of Lincoln, Lincolnshire, England. The airfield was located in a field three quarters of a mile north-north-west of Anwick village.

Originally constructed and operated as a Royal Flying Corps aerodrome in September 1916 it closed between the wars, reopening in September 1939 as a Royal Air Force decoy site to divert bombing raids away from nearby RAF Digby, the closest active fighter airfield.

A minimal facility, even at the height of its active use, the airfield had only grass runways and no permanent brick buildings or hangars. All accommodation was of wooden and metal temporary construction. Within a few years of closing in 1942 there were no visible remains of the former flying facility, although a private landing strip and hangar now exist not far from the original aerodrome.

History
The airfield opened in October 1916 as a Royal Flying Corps aerodrome with three grassed runways laid out in an equilateral triangle. The aerodrome remained busy throughout the First World War as a flying training establishment with a large number of aircraft present, flying mostly a motley assortment of de Havilland DH and Royal Aircraft Factory BE and FE marques.
 
The station was mothballed and placed on a care and maintenance basis between the wars. Surveyed in 1937 as a possible fighter base it was decided that the terrain and location was unsuitable for tarmac runways.  Instead the grass runways were retained and the station was earmarked as a future decoy airfield, a role that started in September 1939.

The airfield was manned by shifts of eight airmen responsible for lighting flare lamps with a portable generator at night that simulated a runway in use, with the intention of drawing the attention of any German bombers looking to attack an airfield. More accurate electronic navigation aids during the later phases of the war rendered these efforts less useful and the practice was abandoned by 1942.

RAF Anwick was abandoned and dismantled in August 1942.

Timeline and units of RAF Anwick

The airfield today
No sign of the airfield remains today but there is a private landing strip and hangar at Anwick that are assumed to be sited close to or on the original aerodrome location. There is a small memorial plaque acknowledging the airfield's existence on a back minor north of Anwick.

See also
 List of former Royal Air Force stations

References

Citations

Bibliography
Bruce Barrymore Halpenny Action Stations: Wartime Military Airfields of Lincolnshire and the East Midlands v. 2

Royal Air Force stations in Lincolnshire
Royal Air Force stations of World War II in the United Kingdom
Military units and formations established in 1916
Military units and formations disestablished in 1942
1916 establishments in England
1942 disestablishments in England